Azza (also spelled Azzeh, Azzah or Alazzeh) also known as Beit Jibrin Camp is a Palestinian refugee camp in the Bethlehem Governorate located within the city of Bethlehem. It is the smallest of the 59 refugee camps in the West Bank and the other Arab countries.

The camp is named after a prominent Palestinian family from the depopulated village of Beit Jibrin west of the Hebron Hills in present-day Israel. The UNRWA recorded a population of 2,025 in 2005, while the Palestinian Central Bureau of Statistics projected a population of 1,750 in 2006, with UNRWA reporting a population of approximately 1,337 refugees and 2,900 total in 2016.

It has been under the control of the Palestinian National Authority since 1995.

References

External links
 Welcome To Bayt Jibrin R.C.
 Al 'Aza Camp (fact sheet), Applied Research Institute–Jerusalem, ARIJ
 Al 'Aza Camp profile, ARIJ
 Al'aza Camp aerial photo, ARIJ
 The priorities and needs for development in Al 'Aza camp based on the community and local authorities' assessment, ARIJ
 Beit Jibrin refugee camp, articles from UNWRA, archived from the original on 2013-08-29

Azar
1950 establishments in Jordan